The Invester (1969–2002) was a Quarter Horse stallion who excelled at halter and at western pleasure, as well as being a famous sire of western pleasure horses.

Life

The Invester was a 1969 sorrel son of Zippo Pat Bars and out of a linebred daughter of Dinky Reed named Hank's Peppy Lou. Hank's Peppy's Lou's dam Logan's Miss Lue, and she was out of a daughter of Dinky Reed.

Jerry Wells bought The Invester as a weanling at the Oklahoma State Fair in 1969. Later, he described the horse as "He was a cherry-red sorrel with stockinged legs, a real pretty head and neck, and lots of body and muscle. He was also straight and correct and a good-minded colt." Wells, however, felt that the original registered name of Hank Lou Bars wasn't a good fit for the colt, and renamed him with the American Quarter Horse Association (or AQHA) as The Invester.<ref name=Campbell>Campbell "Chairman of the Board" Quarter Horse Journal" p. 12</ref>

 Show career 
During his show career, The Invester earned an AQHA Superior Halter Horse award as well as an AQHA Championship and an AQHA Performance Register of Merit. He earned points in Halter, Cutting, English Pleasure, Western Pleasure, and Reining. Although known for being a halter horse, in 1972 The Invester missed making the finals of the National Cutting Horse Association Futurity semi-finals by just one point.

 Breeding record 
Among The Invester's offspring are The Appraiser, Double Vested, El Cicatriz, Bonafid, Investers Skip, The Stockbroker, The Big Investment, Vested Pine, Assets, and Impulsions. His offspring The Big Investment and Impulsions were inducted into the National Snaffle Bit Horse Hall of Fame, along with his grandget January Investment. In 1980, his offspring placed first through fourth in the All American Quarter Horse Congress Two-Year-Old Western Pleasure Futurity.

 Death and honors 
The Invester was the second Quarter horse stallion to be syndicated."There's Fixin to be an Invester Revival" Southern Horseman pp. 20–21 In 1994 he was inducted into the National Snaffle Bit Association Hall of Fame. He was humanely put down on February 28, 2002, due to old age. The Invester was inducted into the AQHA Hall of Fame in 2004.

Pedigree

Notes

References

 All Breed Pedigree Database Pedigree for The Invester accessed on June 26, 2007
 https://www.aqha.com/hall-of-fame AQHA Hall of Fame] accessed on September 2, 2017
 
 
 
 NSBA Hall of Fame'' accessed on July 5, 2007

External links
 The Invester at Quarter Horse Directory
 The Invester at Quarter Horse Legends
 The Invester at Dan McWhirter Quarter Horses

American Quarter Horse show horses
American Quarter Horse sires
1969 animal births
2002 animal deaths
AQHA Hall of Fame (horses)